Milan station, also known as the Quincy, Missouri & Pacific Railroad Depot, is a historic train station located at Milan, Sullivan County, Missouri, United States.  It was built in 1882 by the Quincy, Missouri, and Pacific Railroad.  It is a one-story, rectangular frame building with American Craftsman design elements.  It features a hipped roof with wide eaves supported by heavy curved brackets and a projecting telegraphers bay.  The depot remained in operation until 1939 and is operated by the Sullivan County Historical Society as a railroad museum.

It was listed on the National Register of Historic Places in 1996 as the Milan Railroad Depot.

References

External links
 Sullivan County Historical Society

History museums in Missouri
Railway stations on the National Register of Historic Places in Missouri
Railway stations in the United States opened in 1882
Former Chicago, Burlington and Quincy Railroad stations
National Register of Historic Places in Sullivan County, Missouri
Former railway stations in Missouri